Pistoria is a genus of butterflies in the family Lycaenidae. The single species of this monotypic genus, Pistoria nigropunctata, is found in New Guinea (Australasian realm).

Subspecies
P. n. nigropunctata (south-western New Guinea: Upper Waria Ranges, Papua New Guinea: Mambare)
P. n. siwiensis Tite, 1962 (West Irian: Mount Siwi)
P. n. weylandia Tite, 1962 (West Irian: Weyland Mountains)
P. n. aroa Tite, 1962 (southern Papua New Guinea: Aroa)
P. n. fracta Tite, 1962 (New Guinea: Rawlinson Mountains)
P. n. kratke Tite, 1962 (New Guinea: Kratke Mountains)

References

Polyommatini
Monotypic butterfly genera
Taxa named by Francis Hemming
Lycaenidae genera